Norman Stanley Fletcher, commonly nicknamed "Fletch", is the main fictional character in the BBC sitcom Porridge, and the spin-off, Going Straight. He was played by Ronnie Barker.

In the pilot episode, Fletcher claims to Mr. Barrowclough that he was sentenced for stealing a lorry which then crashed through garden walls and a toolshed when its brakes failed. This turns out to be a shaggy dog story leading up to the punchline "I asked for six other fences to be taken into consideration". In other episodes it is stated that he was sentenced for breaking and entering and that he is a career burglar.

His tactics range from the practical (stealing pills from the prison doctor and eggs from the prison farmyard), to the symbolic (finding new and imaginative ways to stick two fingers up at Mackay and get away with it). In return, Mackay's frenzied, neurotic attempts to catch Fletcher out, when fruitful, give the warder a level of smugness and satisfaction that is only accentuated by his charge's hostility and skulking.

Fletch is also surprised when this spell in prison finds him taking on the role of father figure. It is left to him to help Warren when he needs a letter read or written, and to oversee new, younger inmates such as McClaren and Godber.

Fletch is also manipulative, and can play upon the sympathies and weaknesses of people like the liberal warden, Mr Barrowclough, and the ineffectual prison governor to acquire more pleasant employment, accommodation or special privileges.

Fletcher was born, in his words, "two-two-thirty-two" - 2 February 1932. He is a native of Muswell Hill. His elder daughter Ingrid was conceived in Highgate Cemetery, shortly before his marriage to Isobel at the age of 19. He also has a younger daughter Marion and a son Raymond. Fletcher did his post-war National Service in the early 1950s, including service in the Malayan Emergency. He joined the Royal Army Service Corps or RASC, which he refers to in army slang as "Run Away, Someone's Coming". He was "King of the Teds" in Muswell Hill, circa 1955, and retains fond memories of Gloria, a seamstress with whom he had an affair at that time, and who used to tighten his trousers for him.

Upon release from prison Fletch decided to give up his criminal career. In the follow-up series, Going Straight, he took a job as a hotel night-porter, but found himself often tempted back into crime, although he resisted. His wife, Isobel, had left him, leaving him in sole charge of Raymond.

When last seen, in the mockumentary Life Beyond the Box: Norman Stanley Fletcher, Fletch was landlord of a pub in Muswell Hill, alongside his second wife, Gloria (an old flame briefly mentioned in Porridge).

In 2009, the character was revived in a stage production, penned by Dick Clement and Ian La Frenais, and is played by Shaun Williamson.

In the 2016 revival of the show, also titled Porridge, it is revealed that Fletcher died circa 2011.

Personality and traits
For a man of his age and poor education, Fletch is highly intelligent and speaks with confidence and a large vocabulary on a wide range of topics including politics, race relations, the justice system and society in general, and appears to possess a considerable degree of natural intellect. He is a tolerant man who briefly dabbled in Marxist politics in his youth but is often cynical about the world and generally pessimistic. For the most part his attitude never goes beyond simple complaining and playful teasing of Mr. Mackay, although Fletch occasionally shows a darker side which reflects his true mental state, usually when he is talking about his past. The large amount of time he has spent in prison has left him feeling that he has wasted his life. In the final episode of Going Straight, he is convinced not to return to crime after walking into a pet shop and seeing the animals in cages, reminding him of his time in prison. He struggles to adapt to life on the outside after his spell in Slade prison, and his frayed nerves have resulted in a quick temper, shown by how quick he is to shout at his daughter Ingrid. He is also something of a drinker - on one occasion, after sneaking away from an outdoor trip, he goes straight to a pub and drinks several pints of beer, one of which he downs in one. In Going Straight, he consumes several pints of beer and a few whisky chasers just on the train from Carlisle to London. He mentions that an "average day" in Muswell Hill involved visiting four different pubs for a "swift half". He is upset that his wife Isobel has left him and struggles to cope with the responsibility of holding his family together.

Fletch is a Tottenham Hotspur supporter; in one episode Fletch tells an inmate that while on compassionate leave he had "a sing song at the pub, a Sunday roast and watched Spurs win at home". In the first episode of Going Straight he collects his personal possessions upon his release from the prison which includes a Tottenham Hotspur key chain. However, in the film version, Fletcher is a supporter of Leyton Orient.

References

Porridge characters
Fictional people from London
Fictional bartenders
Television characters introduced in 1974
Fictional career criminals